Thomas Kutschaty (born 12 June 1968) is a German politician of the Social Democratic Party (SPD) who has been serving as leader of the SPD in North Rhine-Westphalia since 2021. Kutschaty has been a member of the Landtag of North Rhine-Westphalia since 2005 and has served as the parliamentary leader of the SPD since 2018. Prior to this Kutschaty served as the Minister for Justice of North Rhine-Westphalia from 2010 till 2017.

Early life, education and family 
Kutschaty was born in Essen, West Germany in June 1968. His family was railway workers' family, with Kutschaty being the first to complete his Abitur. Kutschaty studied law at the Ruhr University Bochum, passing his first state exam in 1995 and his second in 1997. Kutschaty was active as a lawyer between 1997 and 2010.

Kutschaty is married and has three children.

Political career

Career in local politics 
Kutschaty has been a member of the SPD since 1986. Between 1987 and 1989 he served as the Spokesperson of the Young Socialists in Essen-Borbeck, and between 1998 and 1990 he was member of the executive of the Young Socialists in Essen. Additionally Kutschaty has been a member of the executive of the SPD Essen-Borbeck, and served as its leader since 1994. In 1999 he was elected to the Essen city council, where he served in the committee on urban development and city planning until 2004.

Career in state politics 
Kutschaty was elected to the Landtag of North Rhine-Westfalia in the 2005 state election. In the Landtag Kutschaty was a member of the internal affairs committee as well as the justice committee and the parliamentary oversight committee. He also served as the deputy chair of the committee investigating the prison JVA Siegburg.

After Hannelore Kraft (SPD) formed a minority government following the 2010 state election, she appointed Kutschaty as justice minister, an office which was reappointed to after the 2012 state election. He left government after the Hannelore Kraft and the SPD lost the 2017 state election against Armin Laschet and the Christian Democrats. Kutschaty was succeeded as justice minister by Peter Biesenbach (CDU).

Kutschaty was nominated by his party as delegate to the Federal Convention for the purpose of electing the President of Germany in 2022.

Kutschaty was the lead candidate for the Social Democrats in the 2022 North Rhine-Westfalia state election but lost out against incumbent Minister-President Hendrik Wüst.

Other activities

Corporate boards
 NRW.BANK, Member of the Supervisory Board
 Sparkasse Essen, Member of the Supervisory Board (2017–2021)

Non-profit organizations
 German War Graves Commission, Member

References

External links 

 
 
  at wahl.de

1968 births
Living people
Social Democratic Party of Germany politicians
20th-century German politicians
21st-century German politicians
People from Essen
Politicians from Essen
Ruhr University Bochum alumni
Government ministers of Germany
Members of the Landtag of North Rhine-Westphalia